Eucalyptus spreta is a species of mallet or marlock that is endemic to the south coast of Western Australia. It has smooth bark, narrow lance-shaped to curved adult leaves, flower buds in groups of seven, white flowers and cup-shaped fruit.

Description
Flowering has been recorded in March and the flowers are white.

Taxonomy and naming
The specific epithet (spreta) is from the Latin word spretus, (the past participle of spreno) meaning "separated" or "removed", referring to the isolated distribution of this species from the similar E. pileata.

Distribution and habitat
This mallet grows in woodland in flat areas with calcareous loam or red sand soil types. It is found to the south and east of Norseman to near Balladonia in the Coolgardie, Mallee and Nullarbor biogeographic regions.

Conservation status
This eucalypt is classified as "not threatened" by the Western Australian Government Department of Parks and Wildlife.

See also
List of Eucalyptus species

References

Eucalypts of Western Australia
spreta
Myrtales of Australia
Plants described in 2001
Taxa named by Lawrence Alexander Sidney Johnson
Taxa named by Ken Hill (botanist)